ISFA may refer to:

Independent Schools Foundation Academy
Independent Schools Football Association
Intercollegiate Soccer Football Association
International String Figure Association
International Shootfighting Association
Iranian Short Film Academy awards